Chuzak (also Romanized as Chūzak; also known as Chizuk, Chūzok, Chūzūk, Jūrak, and Jūrīk) is a village in, and the capital of, Sojas Rud Rural District of Sojas Rud District of Khodabandeh County, Zanjan province, Iran. At the 2006 National Census, its population was 1,558 in 363 households. The following census in 2011 counted 1,697 people in 493 households. The latest census in 2016 showed a population of 1,787 people in 549 households; it was the largest village in its rural district.

References 

Khodabandeh County

Populated places in Zanjan Province

Populated places in Khodabandeh County